General Mohamed Abshir Airport  is an airport serving Garowe, the administrative capital of the autonomous Puntland region in northeastern Somalia.

Overview
The General Mohamed Abshir also known as Garowe Airport, is situated about 12 km from the Garowe city center. It was officially opened in 2010 under the aegis of Puntland's Ministry for Civil Aviation and Airports. The first phase of the airport's construction was completed through a public-private partnership over a period of seven years, with the Garowe-based Mubarak construction company having assisted significantly in completing the project. The airport also attempts to adhere to the air transport standards established by the International Civil Aviation Organization (ICAO).

Through its representative to Kuwait, Faisal Hawar, the Puntland government signed an agreement in Dubai with a Kuwaiti company for the development of facilities at the Garowe International Airport as well as Maakhir University. The deal was valued at US$10 million and was financed by the Kuwait Fund for Arab Economic Development (KFAED). In October 2013, Puntland Minister of Finance Farah Ali Jama and KFAED Deputy Director Hamad Al-Omar signed a follow-up Grant Agreement in Kuwait. The pact will see the fund extend $10 million, of which $6 million will be allocated to finance the Garowe Airport Project and the remainder will be earmarked for the Maakhir University Project.

The project consists of paving a new runway around 2,200 meters in length and 45 meters in width, with shoulders of about 65 meters on each side. It also includes a passenger terminal building of an area of 1,000 meters consisting of two floors to accommodate 120 passengers, a control tower with a height of 25 meters, an alley perpendicular to the runway with a width of 50 meters, an apron area with a width of 100 meters and length of 200 meters, a lighting system, drainage system, firefighting station, a 2.5-meter fence, and safety equipment. Additionally, the deal entails consulting and engineering services for design and supervision of work construction.

Airlines and destinations

Accidents and incidents
On December 2, 2020, an Air Djibouti Boeing 737-500 suffered a main landing gear collapse on landing, and although smoke was spotted coming from the aircraft, the airport's only fire truck has been out of operation for two months due to a missing wheel.

See also
List of airports in Somalia

References

External links

Airports in Somalia
Puntland
Garowe